Butley is a play by Simon Gray set in the office of an English lecturer at a university in London, England.  The title character, a  T. S. Eliot scholar, is an alcoholic who loses his wife and his close friend and colleague – and possibly male lover – on the same day. The action of the dark comedy takes place over several hours on the same day during which he bullies students, friends and colleagues while falling apart at the seams. The play won the 1971 Evening Standard Award for Best Play.

Characters
Ben Butley
Joseph Keyston
Miss Heasman
Edna Shaft
Anne Butley
Reg Nuttall
Mr Gardner

Productions
Butley was first performed at the Criterion Theatre in London on 14 July 1971, produced by Michael Codron and directed by Harold Pinter, with the following cast:

Ben Butley – Alan Bates
Joseph Keyston – Richard O'Callaghan
Miss Heasman – Brenda Cavendish
Edna Shaft – Mary Wimbush
Anne Butley – Colette O'Neil
Reg Nuttall – Michael Byrne
Mr Gardner – George Fenton

Alan Bates won the 1971 Evening Standard Award for Best Actor for his performance. The role of Butley was subsequently taken on by Alec McCowen and Richard Briers in the same production. Bates reprised his performance the following year in a Broadway production directed by James Hammerstein, set design Eileen Diss, lighting and set design Neil Peter Jampolis, at the Morosco Theatre, where it ran for 14 previews and 135 performances. The show cast Hayward Morse  (Joseph Keyston), Geraldine Sherman (Miss Heasman), Barbara Lester (Edna Shaft), Holland Taylor (Anne Butley), Roger Newman (Reg Nuttall), and Christopher Hastings (Mr Gardner). Bates won the Tony Award for Best Actor in a Play and the Drama Desk Award for Outstanding Performance, and Gray was nominated for the Tony Award for Best Play.

A successful 2006 limited-run Broadway revival at the Booth Theatre was directed by Nicholas Martin. It starred Nathan Lane and Dana Ivey, who was nominated for the Tony for Best Featured Actress in a Play.

A 2011 London West End production of the play was produced for the Duchess Theatre, directed by Lindsay Posner with a cast including Dominic West, Paul McGann, Penny Downie, Amanda Drew, and Emma Hiddleston.  The production started at the Brighton Festival from 25 May 2011 and in the West End from 1 June 2011.

In his introduction to the play, Harold Pinter wrote:

1974 film
 
A 1974 film adaptation Butley directed by Pinter starred Alan Bates, Jessica Tandy, Richard O'Callaghan, Susan Engel, and Michael Byrne.

References

External links

Butley information, Simon Gray website

1971 plays
English plays
West End plays
Broadway plays
Academic culture
British plays adapted into films